Taylan Antalyalı (born 8 January 1995) is a Turkish professional footballer who plays as a midfielder for Ankaragücü.

Professional career

Gençlerbirliği
Taylan Antalyalı was transferred to the Super League team Gençlerbirliği before the 2014–2015 season. Antalyalı made his professional debut in a 4-1 Süper Lig loss to Trabzonspor on 1 December 2014. He played only two times in Super League during its first season with this team but no game in the second season. So he was put on loan and joined the Kayseri Erciyesspor on 1 February 2016 en 1. Lig. He played 13 matches and scored one time. The next season, he was again put on loan for another team, Hacettepe SK playing 27 games in this 2. Lig team and scoring 2 goals.

Erzurumspor
Its good performance put a great interest on the player and he signed, as a free transfer on 1 August 2017, a three-year contract with BB Erzurumspor, who wanted to establish an ambitious team with the goal to participate in the Super League at the end of the 2017–18 season. During this 1. Lig 2017–2018 season Taylan Antalyali played 27 match, scored 2 times and efficiently participated in the 6th place of the team qualifying it to the play-off. He played the three matches of the play-off, scoring during the first one and participating in the victory of its team in the Final against Gaziantep SK.
The Super League was difficult for the team but Taylan Antalyali played 31 match and scored 6 times. Erzurumspor was relegated to the 1.Lig.

Galatasaray
The midfielder began the next season in the 1. Lig for three match before being transferred to Galatasaray. He signed a four-year contract with Galatasaray in the 2019–20 season for 1 million €.

Ankaragücü (loan)
On 8 September 2022, he signed a 1-year loan contract with Süper Lig team Ankaragücü.

International career
He made his debut for Turkey national football team on 24 March 2021 in a World Cup qualifier against Netherlands.

Career statistics

Club

International

References

External links
 
 
 
 
 

1995 births
Living people
Sportspeople from Muğla
Turkish footballers
Turkey youth international footballers
Turkey international footballers
Galatasaray S.K. footballers
Erzurumspor footballers
Hacettepe S.K. footballers
Kayseri Erciyesspor footballers
Gençlerbirliği S.K. footballers
Bucaspor footballers
Süper Lig players
TFF Second League players
Association football midfielders
UEFA Euro 2020 players
MKE Ankaragücü footballers